Teresva is an urban-type settlement in Tiachiv Raion (district) of Zakarpattia Oblast (region) in western Ukraine. It is situated at the confluence of the rivers Tisza and Teresva. The town's population was 7,554 at the 2001 Ukrainian Census.

References

Urban-type settlements in Tiachiv Raion
Populated places established in the 1450s